Vayasu Pilichindi is a 1978 Indian Telugu-language film directed by C. V. Sridhar. It is a remake of his own Tamil film Ilamai Oonjal Aadukirathu (1978). The film stars Kamal Haasan, Rajinikanth, Sripriya and Jayachitra, all reprising their roles from the original Tamil version. It focuses on two friends falling in love with the same woman.

Plot 
Raja, an orphan, is brought up by his friend Murali's mother and is the general manager for Murali's marketing agency. Murali treats Raja not just as a friend, but as a brother and depends on him for all business decisions. Raja is in love with Padma, a college student. Padma's relative Jayanthi is a young widow who works at Murali's office. Murali, an alcoholic with a roving eye, is not aware of Raja's love for Padma. Padma is the only girl who rejects Murali's advances. Though Jayanthi knows about the love affair between Raja and Padma, Raja's presence stimulates her sexually. Once she accompanies Raja and Padma for a film screening and unable to control her sexual feelings, comes out. Murali offers her a lift in his car; both get excited in the privacy of the car, but suddenly feel guilty about the incident.

A disturbed Jayanthi avails leave and goes to her village and Padma joins her, as Raja goes on an official tour. Prabhu, planning to surprise Padma, proceeds to Jayanthi's village to meet Padma. When Raja lands at Jayanthi's home, she is alone as Padma has gone to attend a wedding in a nearby village. Jayanthi convinces Raja to stay back overnight, so that he can meet Padma the next day. Jayanthi arouses Raja in the night and they make love. Raja, feeling guilty about the whole event, writes a letter of apology to Jayanthi and leaves. Devastated to read the note when she returns to Jayanthi's house, Padma returns to Madras, where she starts distancing herself from Raja without revealing why.

Murali continues to pursue Padma. When she falls down, he saves her and gets her admitted in a hospital, impressing her father. Murali happily informs Raja about his feelings for Padma; being a good friend and grateful for the help given by Murali's family, Raja remains silent. He accompanies Murali's mother to formally propose Murali's marriage with Padma. Padma's father accepts the proposal, and Padma remains silent. When Raja confronts her, she reveals that she had read his letter to Jayanthi, who is carrying his child. Shocked with the news, Raja leaves Madras without informing Murali and his mother and they feel upset thinking Raja is angry with them. Later Jayanthi writes a letter to Raja informing him of her pregnancy. Murali reads the letter and now knows why Raja left abruptly. Angry and betrayed, Murali decides to sever ties with Raja then and there.

Raja searches for Jayanthi and finds her in Bangalore. He makes arrangements to marry her, but she has an accident. Before she dies, he ties a thaali around her neck, giving her the dignity of a wife. He goes to Ooty to work in an estate. Meanwhile, Murali and Padma's wedding is postponed, as Murali falls ill and is advised rest by his doctor. He and Padma come to the same estate on holiday, unaware that Raja works there. Raja meets them without realising that Murali knows about him and Jayanthi and apologises to Murali for leaving their home suddenly. Murali though is in no mood to forgive him. But Padma, on learning that Raja married Jayanthi before she died, forgives him and tries to become close to him again. Seeing them together, an enraged Murali takes Raja to a cliff; when he is about to shoot Raja, Padma reveals that they were originally in love and how they broke up due to Jayanthi's interference and Raja's honourable act in making Jayanthi his wife and legitimising their child, before she died. Murali and Raja reconcile, and Murali presents Padma to Raja as he knows they truly love each other, and leaves for Madras.

Cast 
 Kamal Haasan as Raja
 Rajinikanth as Murali
 Sripriya as Padma
 Jayachitra as Jayanthi

Production 
Vayasu Pilichindi is a remake of C. V. Sridhar's own Tamil film Ilamai Oonjal Aadukirathu (1978). The same cast of that version were retained for the Telugu remake. It was given an "A" (adults only) certificate by the Central Board of Film Certification.

Soundtrack 
The soundtrack was composed by Ilaiyaraaja.

References

External links 
 

1970s Telugu-language films
1978 films
Films directed by C. V. Sridhar
Films scored by Ilaiyaraaja
Telugu remakes of Tamil films